Reality Leigh Winner (born December 4, 1991)  is an American former enlisted US Air Force member and NSA translator. In 2018, she was given the longest prison sentence ever imposed for unauthorized release of government information to the media after she leaked an intelligence report about Russian interference in the 2016 United States elections. She was sentenced to five years and three months in federal prison.

On June 3, 2017, while employed by the military contractor Pluribus International Corporation, Winner was arrested on suspicion of leaking an intelligence report about Russian interference in the 2016 United States elections from the National Security Agency (NSA) to the news website The Intercept. The report indicated that Russian hackers accessed voter registration rolls in the United States with an email phishing operation, though it was unclear whether any changes had been made.

Concerns were raised that The Intercepts handling of the material exposed her as the source and contributed to her arrest. Twice denied bail, Winner was held at the Lincoln County Jail in Lincolnton, Georgia. On August 23, 2018, Winner was convicted of "removing classified material from a government facility and mailing it to a news outlet" and sentenced to five years and three months in prison as part of a plea deal. She was incarcerated at the Federal Medical Center, Carswell in Fort Worth, Texas, and released to a transitional facility on June 2, 2021.

Early life
Winner was born in Texas to Billie and Ronald Winner. Her unique name was selected by her father.

She grew up in Kingsville and attended H. M. King High School, where she learned Latin at school, studied Arabic in her free time, and played on the soccer and tennis teams.

Her father's influence early in her life had extensively shaped Winner's world view on many topics, including politics, history, philosophy, and religion. After the September 11 attacks, Winner had intense discussions with her father on geopolitics and Islam and he sparked her interest in the Arabic language.

Career 

Winner served in the United States Air Force from 2010 to 2016, achieving the rank of senior airman (an E-4 paygrade) with the 94th Intelligence Squadron. After two years of language and intelligence training, she was posted to Fort Meade, Maryland. She worked as a cryptologic linguist, being fluent in the Persian language and in Dari, the Persian dialect spoken in Afghanistan, as well as in Pashto. Assigned to the drone program, she listened in on intercepted foreign chatter to provide U.S. forces with intelligence. Winner was awarded the Air Force Commendation Medal for "aiding in 650 enemy captures, 600 enemies killed in action and identifying 900 high value targets."

A month after being honorably discharged from the Air Force in November 2016, Winner moved to Augusta, Georgia, where she taught at a
CrossFit gym and a yoga studio. Winner applied for jobs with NGOs in Afghanistan, hoping to use her Pashto language skills with refugees. However, her search for overseas employment was frustrated by her lack of post-secondary education. Still possessing a top-secret security clearance, Winner was then hired by Pluribus International Corporation, a small firm that provides services under contract to the National Security Agency. On February 13, 2017, Pluribus assigned her to work at Fort Gordon, a U.S. Army post near Augusta, where she had once been stationed while in the Air Force.

Transmission of national defense information 
Assigned to translate documents relating to Iran's aerospace program from Persian, Winner was employed by  Pluribus International Corporation at the time of her arrest. It was while translating these documents that Winner came across the single classified document subsequently anonymously mailed to The Intercept. Winner told CBS's 60 Minutes that she leaked the classified material because she thought Americans were being intentionally misled about Russia's active measures to influence the outcome of the 2016 United States presidential election.

Arrest
When FBI agents arrived at her home on June 3, 2017, Winner didn’t insist on consulting a lawyer, and the FBI agents failed to inform her of her Miranda rights when Winner was arrested. When her house was searched and she was initially questioned, Winner stated that she had a pink AR-15, a 9-millimeter Glock, and a 15gauge shotgun, as well as two pets: a foster dog and a cat. She stated she "wasn't trying to be a Snowden or anything".

The Department of Justice announced her arrest on June 5. She was detained even before The Intercept published the article that was based upon the leaks. The Intercept report described Russian military attempts to interfere with the 2016 presidential election by hacking a U.S. voting software supplier and by sending spear-phishing emails to more than 100 local election officials just days before the November 8 election. The story was based upon a top secret May 5, 2017 National Security Agency (NSA) document leaked to them anonymously.

Julian Assange, the founder of WikiLeaks, called on the public to support Winner, offering a $10,000 reward for information about a reporter for The Intercept who had allegedly helped the U.S. government identify Winner as the leaker. Assange wrote on Twitter that "Winner is no Clapper or Petraeus with 'elite immunity'. She's a young woman against the wall for talking to the press."

Role of The Intercept 
The Intercept sent copies of the documents to the NSA on May 30 to confirm their veracity, and the NSA notified the FBI. According to Vice magazine, an FBI report said the documents "appeared to be folded and/or creased, suggesting they had been printed and hand-carried out of a secured space." Through an internal audit, the NSA determined that Winner was one of six workers who had accessed the particular documents on its classified system, but only Winner's computer had been in contact with The Intercept using a personal email account. On June 3, the FBI obtained a warrant to search Winner's electronic devices, and she was arrested. Both journalists and security experts have suggested that The Intercept handling of the reporting, which included publishing the documents unredacted and including the printer tracking dots, was used to identify Winner as the leaker. In October 2020, The Intercepts co-founding editor Glenn Greenwald wrote that Winner had sent her documents to The Intercepts New York newsroom with no request that any specific journalist work on them. He called her exposure a "deeply embarrassing newsroom failure" resulting from "speed and recklessness" for which he was publicly blamed "despite having no role in it." He said editor-in-chief Betsy Reed "oversaw, edited and controlled that story." An internal review conducted by The Intercept into its handling of the document provided by Winner found that its "practices fell short of the standards to which [they] h[e]ld [them]selves".

Prosecution 

Winner was charged with "removing classified material from a government facility and mailing it to a news outlet." On June 8, 2017, she pleaded not guilty to a charge of "willful retention and transmission of national defense information" and was denied bail. Prosecutors alleged she may have been involved in other leaks of classified information, and might try to flee the country if released. Justice Department lawyers also argued that her defense team should not be allowed to discuss any classified information, even if it was in news reports published by the media.

The U.S. magistrate judge who presided over Winner's bail hearing, Brian Epps, said, "She seems to have a fascination with the Middle East and Islamic terrorism," and quoted her writing: "It's a Christlike vision to have a fundamentalist Islamic state." Federal agents had found her diary during a search of her home, in which she allegedly expressed support for Taliban leaders and Osama bin Laden, and for burning down the White House.  However, one of the prosecutors at her bail hearing said, "The government is not in any way suggesting the defendant has become a jihadist or that she is a Taliban sympathizer."

On August 29, 2017, Winner's attorneys filed a motion in district court to suppress her statements to law enforcement, arguing that Winner was not read her Miranda rights before being interrogated by the FBI on June 3. On October 5, 2017, Judge Brian Epps denied a second request from her defense attorneys that bail be set. In December 2017, The Intercept reported that Winner's defense team was allowed to discuss the case with her, including its classified aspects, in a Sensitive Compartmented Information Facility (SCIF).

On January 31, 2018, the U.S. Court of Appeals for the Eleventh Circuit affirmed a lower court order blocking Winner from posting bond, determining that no combination of conditions would reasonably assure her presence at trial, thus ensuring that she remained in jail until her trial, which was scheduled to begin on October 15, 2018.

A "Stand with Reality" campaign was formed by representatives from Courage to Resist, the Electronic Frontier Foundation and the Freedom of the Press Foundation with the goal of "raising public awareness" to ensure that Reality Winner received a fair trial. Billie Winner-Davis, mother of Reality Winner, called on members of the public to join the campaign.

On June 21, 2018, Winner asked the court to allow her to change her plea to guilty. On June 26, she pleaded guilty to one count of felony transmission of national defense information. Winner's plea agreement with prosecutors called for her to serve five years and three months in prison followed by three years of supervised release. No one has ever received a longer sentence for leaking classified information to a media outlet.

Sentencing and confinement 
On August 23, 2018, Winner was sentenced to the agreed-upon five years and three months in prison for violating the Espionage Act of 1917. Prosecutors said her sentence, sixty-three months in prison, was the longest ever imposed in federal court for an unauthorized release of government information to the media. At her sentencing, Winner told the judge, “My actions were a cruel betrayal of my nation’s trust in me.” The New York Times reported, "Under the plea agreement, Ms. Winner will be transferred to the Federal Bureau of Prisons Federal Medical Center, Carswell in Fort Worth, Texas, where she can receive treatment for bulimia and be relatively close to her family."

On August 24, 2018, President Donald Trump tweeted, "Ex-NSA contractor to spend 63 months in jail over 'classified' information. Gee, this is 'small potatoes' compared to what Hillary Clinton did! So unfair Jeff, Double Standard." Winner expressed ironic appreciation for Trump's support, saying, "I can't thank him enough." Titus Nichols, Winner's lawyer, called the tweet "bizarre" and that it was just Trump "taking aim at Jeff (Attorney General Jeff Sessions)". On August 31, Winner said that she would ask Trump for clemency as a result of his tweet, adding that her legal team was already working on her pardon application.

In 2019, The Guardian compared Winner's case to those of Daniel Everette Hale and Henry Kyle Frese.

On April 24, 2020, a federal judge rejected Winner's request to commute the remaining 19 months of her 63-month sentence and be released to home confinement due to the COVID-19 pandemic. Winner's lawyer argued that her history of respiratory illness and immune system compromised by bulimia makes her highly vulnerable to the virus. Two inmates had tested positive before Winner was  transferred to the federal medical center where, under the terms of her June 2018 guilty plea agreement, Winner was housed to meet her special needs. She was immediately quarantined and never entered the general population there. The government insisted that the Bureau of Prisons "has taken aggressive action to mitigate the danger and is taking careful steps to protect inmates' and BOP staff members' health." The judge found that Winner did not exhaust her administrative remedies through the BOP, which he held has sole authority to grant her compassionate release. Winner tested positive for COVID-19 in July 2020. By September 13, 2020, Winner was recovering from the coronavirus, although still experiencing occasional shortness of breath.

Release from prison
On June 2, 2021, Winner was transferred from prison to a transitional facility, the San Antonio, Texas, Residential Reentry Management center. According to Alison Grinter Allen, Winner's lawyer, she left prison early as a result of "good behavior" while inside, and not because of compassionate release. Betsy Reed, the editor-in-chief of The Intercept, commented, "Selective and politically motivated prosecutions of leakers and whistleblowers under the Espionage Act – which dramatically escalated under Barack Obama, opening the door for the Trump justice department's abuses – are an attack on the First Amendment that will one day be judged harshly by history."

Personal life 
Winner speaks the Iranian languages Farsi, Dari and Pashto.

In popular culture
In 2019, Tina Satter staged the play Is This a Room, based on the transcript of Winner's interview by the FBI. Is This A Room was given its Dutch premiere at the 2019 Noorderzon Festival in Groningen in the Netherlands, and was further presented in New York City at the Vineyard Theatre later that year. Is This A Room ran on Broadway at the Lyceum Theater, opening on October 10, 2021 and closing November 27. Winner was not involved with the production during its initial Off-Broadway run and was unable to see the Broadway production due to still being under house arrest, but spoke with the creative team extensively following her release from prison and video-called into the opening night performance's curtain call. A film adaptation of Is This A Room was announced to be in development in June 2022, with Sydney Sweeney attached to play Reality Winner alongside Josh Hamilton and Marchánt Davis. Tina Satter and James Paul Dallas adapted the script, with Satter directing in her feature debut. The film, Reality, will premiere at the Berlin International Film Festival in 2023.

In October 2022, it was announced that Susanna Fogel will direct a biographical black comedy film about Winner's life titled Winner, based on a screenplay by Kerry Howley, with Emilia Jones to portray Winner.

An excerpt from Is this A Room was aired in the March 13, 2020 episode of This American Life.

A documentary film United States vs. Reality Winner directed by Sonia Kennebeck, premiered at South by Southwest in March 2021.

Her story was featured in the April 21, 2021, episode of the TBS series Full Frontal with Samantha Bee.  It was also featured in the December 5, 2021, episode of the CBS series 60 Minutes.

See also 
 Timeline of Russian interference in the 2016 United States elections
 Timeline of investigations into Trump and Russia (January–June 2017)
 Daniel Ellsberg
 Katharine Gun
 Thomas A. Drake

References

External links 

 
 FBI Affidavit in Support of Application for Arrest Warrant (Case 1:17-mj-00024-BKE / Filed 06-05-2017)
 Transcript of FBI interview

1991 births
21st-century American military personnel
Linguists from the United States
Women linguists
American prisoners and detainees
Living people
National Security Agency people
People from Augusta, Georgia
People from Kingsville, Texas
People associated with Russian interference in the 2016 United States elections
United States Air Force airmen
American whistleblowers
Criminals from Texas
Prisoners and detainees of the United States federal government
21st-century American criminals
People convicted under the Espionage Act of 1917
American female criminals